

List of Ambassadors

Liron Bar-Sade 2021-
Ophir Kariv 2018 - 
Zeev Boker 2015 - 2018
Boaz Modai 2010 - 2015
Zion Evrony 2006 - 2010
Daniel Megiddo 2002 - 2006
Mark Sofer 1999 - 2002
Zvi Gabay 1994 - 1999 (first resident ambassador from Israel)
Shlomo Argov (Non-Resident, London) 1979 - 1982
Gideon Rafael (Non-Resident, London) 1974 - 1977

References

See also
Ireland–Israel relations

Ireland
Israel